List of authors who have written non-fiction (informational) books for children. For a discussion of the criteria used to define something as a work of children's literature, see children's literature.

See also
List of children's literature writers
List of non-fiction writers

 
 
Lists of writers